Architextiles refers to a broad range of projects and approaches that combine architecture, textiles, and materials science. Architextiles explore textile-based approaches and inspirations for creating structures, spaces, surfaces, and textures. Architextiles contribute to the creation of adaptable, interactive, and process-oriented spaces. Awning is the most basic type of architectural textile. Hylozoic Ground, on the other hand, is a modern and complex architextile example. Hylozoic Ground is an interactive architecture model presented in the 18th Biennale of Sydney. Olympiastadion is another example of modern architecture presented in an unusual way.

Etymology 
Architextiles is a portmanteau word of textiles and architecture. 'Technology' and 'Textiles' both are derivation of a Latin language word  that means 'construct' or 'weave'.Textiles is also among derivative words of the Ancestor of the Indo-European language word "tek" which is the root to architecture.

Architecture and textiles

Architectural textiles
Architextiles is the architecture that is inspired by characteristics, elements, and manufacturing techniques of textiles. It is a field that spans multiple disciplines. It is a combination of textile and architectural manufacturing techniques. Laser cutting, ultrasonic welding, thermoplastic setting, pultrusion, electrospinning, and other advanced textile manufacturing techniques are all included in architextiles. Architextiles integrate various fields like architecture, textile design, engineering, physics and materials science.

Textile inspirations 
Architextiles exploits the sculptural potential of textile-based structures. Textiles motivate architects with their numerous features, enabling them to express ideas via design and create environmentally conscious buildings. Textiles also influence architecture in the following ways:

Characteristics 
Textiles are adaptable, lightweight, and useful for a variety of structures, both temporary and permanent. Tensile surfaces composed of structural fabrics, such as canopies, roofs, and other types of shelter, are included in architectural textiles. If necessary, the subjected materials are given special purpose finishes, such as waterproofing, to make them suitable for outdoor use.

Coated fabrics 

There is considerable use of coated materials in certain architectures, Pneumatic structures are made of teflon or PVC-coated synthetic materials. Coated  fiberglass, coated polyethylene and coated polyester are the most common  materials used in lightweight structural textiles. Lightweight fabric constructions accounted for 13.2 square yards of total usage in 2006, according to Industrial Fabrics Association International (IFAI)  Chemically inert, Polytetrafluoroethylene fibreglass coating is capable of withstanding temperatures as low as -100 °F (-73 °C) and as high as +450 °F (232 °C).

Interactive textiles 

Textiles that can sense stimuli are known as interactive textiles. They have the capability to adapt or react to the environment. Felecia Davis has designed interactive textiles such as parametric tents that are able to change size and shape in response to changes in light and the number of people underneath.

3D structures 
Soundproof 3D woven walls with a ribbed structure that are suitable for soundproofing and interior designing. Aleksandra Gaca designed the furnishing of the concept car Renault Symbioz with a 3D fabric named 'boko'.

Origami-inspired textiles 
Textiles inspired by origami impart novel properties to architecture. Architects try out origami and three-dimensional fabric structures when designing structures.

History 

Examples of architextiles have been found dating back a long way. Over centuries, nomadic tribes in the Middle East, Africa, the Orient, and the Americas have developed textile structures.

Historical structures 

Historical architextiles include yurts and tents, the great awnings of Colosseum in Rome, the tents of the Mongol Empire, and the Ziggurat Aquar Quf near Baghdad.

Present

Properties 
Architextiles have a number of advantages; primarily, they are cost effective and can be used to construct temporary or transportable structures. The programming can be modified at any time.

Examples of architextiles

Muscle NSA 
NSA Muscle, is a pressurized (Inflatable body) structure which is an interactive model. It is equipped with sensors and computing systems, the MUSCLE is programmed to respond to human visitors.

Carbon tower
The carbon tower is a prototype carbon fiber building.

Hylozoic Ground 
Hylozoic Ground is an exemplar of live architecture, interactive model of architecture which is a kind of architextiles.

Textile growth monument 
Textile growth monument ‘textielgroeimonument’ is a 3D 'woven' structure in the city Tilburg.

Pneumatrix 
Pneumatrix, RCA Department of Architecture, London, a theatre which is deployable and flexible.

See also
 3D textiles
 Maison folie de Wazemmes
 Lars Spuybroek
 Tent
 Wearable technology

References 

Textiles
Architecture
Buildings and structures by type